Thiotricha angelica is a moth of the family Gelechiidae. It was described by John David Bradley in 1961. It is found on Guadalcanal in the Solomon Islands.

References

Moths described in 1961
Thiotricha